Marius Weyers (born 3 February 1945, in Johannesburg) is a South African actor. He lives with his wife Yvette, an artist in her own right, in Rooi-Els in the Western Cape. He received international attention playing Andrew Steyn, a bumbling scientist in the movie The Gods Must Be Crazy (1980). He appeared in Blood Diamond (2006).

Selected filmography
 1967 Love Nights in the Taiga as Markjoff
 1974 No Gold for a Dead Diver as Rene Chagrin
 1977 Target of an Assassin as Colonel Pahler
 1980 The Gods Must Be Crazy as Andrew Steyn
 1982 Gandhi as Train Conductor
 1988 Thieves of Fortune as Unknown
 1989 DeepStar Six as Dr. John Van Gelder
 1989 Farewell to the King as Sergeant Conklin
 1989 Happy Together as Denny Dollenbacher
 1989 Jewel of the Gods as Snowy Grinder
 1992 The Power of One as Professor Daniel Marais
 1992 Golden Girls as Derek
 1993 Bopha! as Van Tonder
 1997 Paljas as Hendrik MacDonald
 2003 Stander as General Francois Jacobus Stander, Andre Stander's Father
 2005 The Triangle as Karl Sheedy
 2006 Blood Diamond as Rudolf Van de Kaap
 Woestynblom (TV series) as Jerry F.
 2013 Nothing for Mahala as Hendrik Botha
 2018 The Seagull (Die Seemeeu) as Piet
 2018 The Recce as General Piet Visagie
 2019 The Story of Racheltjie De Beer as George

References

External links 

 
 Detailed filmography

Living people
1945 births
Afrikaner people
Male actors from Johannesburg
South African male actors
South African people of German descent